Mathias or Matthias Shryock (born near Frederick, Maryland, 1774 – died in Lexington, Kentucky, 1833) was an early American architect and building contractor.

Life and career
Shryock was born in Maryland, where he married in 1798, but moved to Kentucky, eventually settling in Lexington. He built his family's home on the site of what is now Transylvania University.  In 1814, Shryock designed the first Episcopal church in Lexington, and later designed the childhood home of Mary Todd Lincoln on West Main Street, among many other homes in Lexington.  He was the father of two other American architects: Gideon (1802 – 1880) and Cincinnatus (1816 – 1888), both of whom were born in Lexington and achieved fame in their own right, particularly within Kentucky.  According to one Kentucky Department of Highways plaque, the "[b]est known surname in Kentucky architecture is Shryock." In all, Mathias Shryock fathered a total of ten children.

Shryock died of cholera and is buried in Lexington, Kentucky.

External links

1774 births
1833 deaths
Architects from Lexington, Kentucky
Architects from Maryland
Deaths from cholera
Infectious disease deaths in Kentucky
19th-century American architects
People from Frederick County, Maryland